Scaphinotus viduus is a species of ground beetles in the family Carabidae. It is found in North America.

References

 Bousquet, Yves (2012). "Catalogue of Geadephaga (Coleoptera, Adephaga) of America, north of Mexico". ZooKeys, issue 245, 1–1722.
 Erwin, Terry L. (2007). A Treatise on the Western Hemisphere Caraboidea (Coleoptera): Their classification, distributions, and ways of life. Volume I. Trachypachidae, Carabidae - Nebriiformes 1, 323 + 22 plates.

Further reading

 NCBI Taxonomy Browser, Scaphinotus viduus
 Arnett, R.H. Jr., and M. C. Thomas. (eds.). (2000). American Beetles, Volume I: Archostemata, Myxophaga, Adephaga, Polyphaga: Staphyliniformia. CRC Press LLC, Boca Raton, FL.
 
 Richard E. White. (1983). Peterson Field Guides: Beetles. Houghton Mifflin Company.

Carabidae
Beetles described in 1826